The Journal of Black Psychology is a quarterly peer-reviewed academic journal published by SAGE Publications on behalf of the Association of Black Psychologists. The journal covers all aspects of the psychological study of Black populations. It was established in 1974 and its editor-in-chief is Beverly J. Vandiver (Western Michigan University).

Abstracting and indexing
The journal is abstracted and indexed in the Social Sciences Citation Index, Academic Search Premier, Education Resources Information Center, and PsycINFO. According to the Journal Citation Reports, the journal has a 2021 impact factor of 2.608.

References

External links

Black studies publications
Social psychology journals
Publications established in 1974
Quarterly journals
SAGE Publishing academic journals
Academic journals associated with learned and professional societies
8 times per year journals